PT Pelabuhan Indonesia (Persero), trading as Pelindo, is Indonesian State-owned enterprise Based on one of the world's biggest archipelagos with an extensive history in the world maritime stage, Pelabuhan Indonesia (Pelindo) is a world-class port that offers an integrated port service throughout Indonesia. Pelindo is a result of Integration between four State-owned Enterprises (BUMN), namely, PT Pelindo I (Persero), PT Pelindo II (Persero), PT Pelindo III (Persero) and PT Pelindo IV (Persero) was officially found on October 1 2021.The establishment of Pelindo is a strategic initiative of the government as a shareholder to realize national connectivity and a stronger logistics ecosystem network.  Maritime connectivity is projected to improve, whether it is local ports, or international ports.

See also
 Port authority
 List of Indonesian ports
 Islands of Indonesia
 Ministry of Transportation, Indonesia
 Transport in Indonesia

References

External links
  Indonesia Port Corporation 1 at Inaport
  Indonesia Port Corporation 2 at Inaport
  Indonesia Port Corporation 3 official site
  Indonesia Port Corporation 4 at Inaport
  Ministry of Transportation, Indonesia
  ASEAN Ports, Front page
  ASEAN Ports, Indonesia

Port authorities in Indonesia
Government-owned companies of Indonesia